Leroy Hayden (July 31, 1927–February 22, 2008) was an American politician who served as a Democrat in the Kansas State Senate from 1977 to 1992.

References

Democratic Party Kansas state senators
20th-century American politicians
People from Haskell County, Kansas
1927 births
2008 deaths